San Pablo, officially the Municipality of San Pablo, is a 2nd class municipality in the province of Isabela, Philippines. According to the 2020 census, it has a population of 26,320 people.

History
The town was founded on 1646 as Maquila by Fr. Pedro de Santo Tomas, making it the oldest town in Isabela and existing before the province's creation. The original name literally means sparkling. It was then renamed to Cabagan, loosely interpreted as the place where people wear "ba-ag" or "G-strings" when the Spaniards arrived at the Philippine Islands.

In the 1900s, Cabagan was subdivided into three divisions, namely: Cabagan Viejo, Cabagan Nuevo, and Santa Maria. Cabagan Viejo was then renamed to San Pablo, after its patron saint Paul the Apostle whose feast day is celebrated every January 15. Meanwhile, Cabagan Nuevo became the modern-day Cabagan, while Santa Maria retained its name.

Geography

Barangays
San Pablo is politically subdivided into 17 barangays. These barangays are headed by elected officials: Barangay Captain, Barangay Council, whose members are called Barangay Councilors. All are elected every three years.
 Annanuman
 Auitan
 Ballacayu
 Binguang
 Bungad
 Dalena
 Caddangan/Limbauan
 Calamagui
 Caralucud
 Guminga
 Minanga Norte
 Minanga Sur
 San Jose
 Poblacion
 Simanu Norte
 Simanu Sur
 Tupa (San Vicente)

Climate

Demographics

Economy

Government

Local government
The municipality is governed by a mayor designated as its local chief executive and by a municipal council as its legislative body in accordance with the Local Government Code. The mayor, vice mayor, and the councilors are elected directly by the people through an election which is being held every three years.

Elected officials

Congress representation
San Pablo, belonging to the first legislative district of the province of Isabela, currently represented by Hon. Antonio T. Albano.

Education
The Schools Division of Isabela governs the town's public education system. The division office is a field office of the DepEd in Cagayan Valley region. The office governs the public and private elementary and public and private high schools throughout the municipality.

References

External links
 Municipal Profile at the National Competitiveness Council of the Philippines
San Pablo at the Isabela Government Website
Local Governance Performance Management System
[ Philippine Standard Geographic Code]
Philippine Census Information
Municipality of San Pablo

Municipalities of Isabela (province)
Populated places on the Rio Grande de Cagayan